El baño is a 2020 Colombian comedy film directed by Harold Trompetero and written by Alejandro Matallana Posada. It stars Marcela Carvajal, Carlos Hurtado, Aída Morales, Norma Nivia, Biassini Segura and Ana María Arango. It premiered on December 25, 2020 in Colombian theaters.

Synopsis 
In the midst of the confinement that the pandemic has brought us, to those of us who live in family groups or in company, coexistence begins to be a time bomb where there is no space to breathe and free oneself from the pressures of life and relationships with others. THE BATHROOM then becomes the only place where there is individual freedom to vent, to dream, to cry, to keep secrets and intimacies of the life that was led in the days prior to confinement. This is EL BAÑO, a film that narrates the parallel experiences lived by several members of a series of friends who have in common that they were university classmates 15 years ago and now they have to spend 24 hours a day at home while they work and live together. with their loved ones.

Cast 

 Marcela Carvajal
 Carlos Hurtado
 Aída Morales
 Diego Camargo
 Franco Bolívar
 Norma Nivia
 Biassini Segura
 Ana María Arango
 Tatán Mejía
 Maleja Restrepo

Production 
El baño was filmed in its entirety using the cell phones of the actors and actresses during the period of confinement due to the Covid-19 pandemic in Colombia.

References 

2020 films
2020 comedy films
Colombian comedy films
2020s Spanish-language films

Films set in Colombia
Films shot in Colombia
Films about the COVID-19 pandemic